James Henry Iremonger (31 March 1918 – 5 September 2002) was a British bobsledder who competed in the late 1940s. At the 1948 Winter Olympics in St. Moritz, he finished 15th in the four-man event.

References
1948 bobsleigh four-man results
Bobsledding four-man results: 1948-64
British Olympic Association profile
James Iremonger at Sports Reference.com

1918 births
2002 deaths
Olympic bobsledders of Great Britain
Bobsledders at the 1948 Winter Olympics
British male bobsledders